The Athens–Clarke County Metropolitan Statistical Area, as defined by the United States Census Bureau, is an area consisting of four counties - Clarke, Madison, Oconee, and Oglethorpe - in northeastern Georgia, anchored by the city of Athens.  As of the 2020 census, the MSA had a population of 215,479.

Communities
Places with more than 5,000 inhabitants
Athens-Clarke County (balance) – Principal city
Places with 1,000 to 5,000 inhabitants
Bogart
Comer
Watkinsville
Winterville
Places with 500 to 1,000 inhabitants
Colbert
Crawford
Danielsville
North High Shoals
Places with fewer than 500 inhabitants 
Arnoldsville
Bishop
Carlton
Hull
Ila
Lexington
Maxeys

Demographics
As of the census of 2000, there were 166,079 people, 63,406 households, and 37,885 families residing in the MSA. The racial makeup of the MSA was 73.54% White, 20.48% African American, 0.20% Native American, 2.20% Asian, 0.04% Pacific Islander, 2.32% from other races, and 1.22% from two or more races. Hispanic or Latino of any race were 4.79% of the population.

The median income for a household in the MSA was $38,885, and the median income for a family was $46,685. Males had a median income of $33,441 versus $23,764 for females. The per capita income for the MSA was $18,841.

See also
Georgia statistical areas
List of municipalities in Georgia (U.S. state)

References

 
Geography of Clarke County, Georgia
Geography of Madison County, Georgia
Geography of Oconee County, Georgia
Geography of Oglethorpe County, Georgia
Metropolitan areas of Georgia (U.S. state)
Regions of Georgia (U.S. state)